"Cryin' Again" is a song written by Rafe Van Hoy and Don Cook, and recorded by American country music group The Oak Ridge Boys.  It was released in September 1978 as the second single from the album Room Service.  The song reached number 3 on the Billboard Hot Country Singles & Tracks chart.

Chart performance

References

1978 singles
The Oak Ridge Boys songs
Songs written by Don Cook
Song recordings produced by Ron Chancey
ABC Records singles
Songs written by Rafe Van Hoy
1978 songs